The Heckler (1940) is an American short film produced by Columbia Pictures Corporation directed by Del Lord and starring Charley Chase.

Plot
At a baseball game, an irritating heckler (Charley Chase) annoys the crowd and the players with his obnoxious taunts.

Reception
The Heckler has received positive reviews. Hal Erickson wrote that, "The Heckler is without question one of the most consistently funny shorts ever assembled at Columbia, not to mention one of Charley Chase's most hilarious performances." In his book The Great Baseball Films, Rob Edelman described The Heckler as "one of the best-ever baseball-related talkie shorts." Film critic Leonard Maltin wrote that The Heckler was one of Charley Chase's "best starring comedies" and included it in his book "The Great Movie Shorts."

It was remade with minimal stock footage as "Mr. Noisy" starring Shemp Howard in 1946.

References

External links

1940 films
1940 short films
1940s sports comedy films
American baseball films
Films directed by Del Lord
American comedy short films
American black-and-white films
American sports comedy films
1940 comedy films
1940s American films